VNU may refer to:

 Verenigde Nederlandse Uitgeverijen, a Dutch publishing company
 Vietnam National University, Hanoi (VNU), a public university in Hanoi, Vietnam
 Vietnam National University, Ho Chi Minh City (VNUHCM), a national university in Ho Chi Minh City, Vietnam